Søren Lindsted (born February 2, 1957) is a Danish former football player in the striker position. He started his career as a semi-professional with Holbæk Boldklub, reaching the 1976 Danish Cup final and was the team top goalscorer in 1977 and 1978. He then signed a professional contract with FC Twente in the Netherlands, playing there from 1979 to 1982. He also played for Belgian teams KFC Winterslag and RFC de Liège, before returning to Holbæk in 1985. He played a single season with KB, before ending his career with Holbæk in 1990.

In 1981, he was also involved in a large-scale movie project, Escape to Victory. In the movie he played a Danish football player and POW during World War II named Eric Ball. In the movie he gets forced to play a propaganda football match against a selected Nazi German football team in occupied France along with other POW's from a German prisoner of war camp.

References

1957 births
Living people
Danish men's footballers
FC Twente players
RFC Liège players
Kjøbenhavns Boldklub players
Association football forwards